Russell Wade Harrison (born 11 October 1981 in Elizabeth, South Australia) is a former motorcycle speedway rider from Australia.

Career summary
Harrison won the Australian Under-16 Championship in 1995 in Perth and again in 1997 at his home track in Adelaide (Sidewinders Speedway), before going on to be the Australian Under-21 Champion in 2001, winning again at home in Adelaide, this time at the Gillman Speedway. In 2002 he was third in the Australian Under-21 Championship at Gillman behind winner Travis McGowan and second placed Cameron Woodward. Harrison also won the South Australian Championship in 2003 Gillman. As of 2015, Harrison's 2003 win was the last time a South Australian born rider has won the SA Championship (Adelaide based, but Darwin born Rory Schlein would win the title from 2004-2007).

Harrison made his debut in British speedway in 2001 riding for Glasgow Tigers. In 2001 he joined Workington Comets where he stayed for three seasons, before moving to Edinburgh Monarchs in 2005. In 2005 he also rode as a Reserve for Belle Vue Aces in the Elite League at number seven. He moved back to Workington in 2006 after apparently refusing to take his last two rides for Edinburgh during rain soaked meeting against Rye House Rockets on 7 July 2006, before riding for Stoke Potters in 2007.

In September 2007, Harrison decided to retire from speedway after being affected by the serious injuries suffered by team-mate Garry Stead. This followed a poor run of form when he had already decided to stop riding that season, saying, "I just haven't got going at all and I feel I have been letting too many people down" said the Australian. You are a danger to yourself and others when your head is not right and it's best that I stand down now before anything else happens."

However, in early 2008 the King's Lynn Stars signed Harrison for the 2008 season. He rode for Glasgow Tigers and Birmingham Brummies in 2009, and rode for Workington Comets between 2010 and 2012. He quit the Comets in June 2012 due to family and work commitments, but towards the end of 2012 signed for the Comets again to ride in 2013.

His last season was in 2015 for Workington.

References

1981 births
Living people
Australian speedway riders
Sportspeople from Adelaide
Belle Vue Aces riders
Edinburgh Monarchs riders
Glasgow Tigers riders
King's Lynn Stars riders
Stoke Potters riders
Workington Comets riders